Grant Township is a township in Marion County, Kansas, United States.  As of the 2010 census, the township population was 131.

Geography

Cities and towns
The township contains the following settlements:
 Ghost town of Elk (west part of community).

Cemeteries
The township contains the following cemeteries:
 Grant Township Cemetery (aka Youngtown United Methodist Church Cemetery), located in Section 33 T19S R5E.
 Youngtown United Methodist Church Cemetery (aka Grant Township Cemetery), located in Section 20 T19S R5E.
 Unknown Cemetery (no longer in use), located in Section 13 T19S R5E.

References

Further reading

External links
 Marion County website
 City-Data.com
 Marion County maps: Current, Historic, KDOT

Townships in Marion County, Kansas
Townships in Kansas